Avtandil is a Georgian masculine name of Persian origin meaning "the heart of the motherland". The name was used in the 12th-century Georgian poem The Knight in the Panther's Skin by Shota Rustaveli.

It may refer to:
Avtandil (designer), Georgian fashion designer
Avtandil, a character in The Knight in the Panther's Skin, a medieval Georgian epic poem
Avtandil Beridze, Georgian politician
Avtandil Chkuaseli, Soviet footballer
Avtandil Demetrashvili, Georgian jurist and former member of the Constitutional Court
Avtandil Ebralidze, Georgian footballer
Avtandil Gartskia, politician in Abkhazia
Avtandil Gogoberidze, Georgian/Soviet footballer
Avtandil Gvianidze, Georgian footballer
Avtandil Jorbenadze, Georgian politician and former politician
Avtandil Kapanadze, Georgian/Soviet footballer
Avtandil Kopaliani, Georgian rugby player
Avtandil Koridze, Georgian wrestler
Avtandil Khurtsidze, Georgian boxer
Avtandil Makharadze, Georgian actor
Avtandil Silagadze, Georgian economist
Avtandil Tchrikishvili, Georgian judoka
Avtandil Tskitishvili, Georgian general
Avtandil Varsimashvili, Georgian film and theatre director

Georgian masculine given names